Veronica Chater is an American author and memoirist. Chater wrote a memoir of her childhood, Waiting for the Apocalypse: A Memoir of Faith and Family, highlighting her father's obsession with traditional Catholicism and belief in a coming holy chastisement, and her ever-growing family's consequential spiral into poverty.

Chater was one of nine children and currently lives in Berkeley, California. She is a mother to three boys and one macaw bird.

See also 
 Atheist Film Festival

References

American memoirists
American women memoirists
Date of birth missing (living people)
Living people
American biographers
Year of birth missing (living people)
21st-century American women